Elizabeth H. Roberts (born April 17, 1957) is an American politician who served as the 68th Lieutenant Governor of Rhode Island from 2007 to 2015. A member of the Democratic Party, she served in that position during the administrations of Republican Governor Donald Carcieri and Independent-turned Democrat Lincoln Chafee. She was elected in 2006, becoming the state's first female Lieutenant Governor and was succeeded by Daniel McKee on January 6, 2015. She later served as Secretary of Health and Human Services during the administration of Governor Gina Raimondo, but subsequently resigned due to a widely criticized statewide computer system rollout.

Personal life
Roberts graduated from Brown University in 1978 and earned an MBA in Health Care Management from Boston University in 1984. Prior to entering politics, Roberts has worked as a business strategy consultant, policy analyst, and health care manager. She resides in Providence, Rhode Island.

Early political career

Rhode Island State Senate
Roberts served five two-year terms in the Rhode Island Senate from 1996 until 2006. During her tenure in the state Senate, she was an activist for health and medical issues. Roberts also focused on economic development and job growth, and pushed for cleaner air and water, stronger schools, and increased attention to disaster preparedness.

During her tenure in the state Senate she served as the Chairwoman of the Senate Health and Human Services Committee. Later, she served as a co-chair of Permanent Joint Committee on Healthcare Oversight, which she used as a vehicle to push for reform for Blue Cross and Blue Shield, the largest provider of health insurance in Rhode Island.

Roberts also helped expand the state's prescription drug program for seniors (RIPAE) and helped expand coverage to more families through Rite Care, the state's public health system. The reform organization Common Cause named Roberts one of the top two senators in Rhode Island in 2006, giving her the second highest rating in the General Assembly at 91% and an “A” for her reform efforts during the legislative session.

Lieutenant Governor
Roberts was elected the state's first female Lieutenant Governor on November 7, 2006. She was inaugurated as the 68th Lieutenant Governor of Rhode Island on January 2, 2007. She toyed with the idea of running for Governor in the 2010 election, but instead decided to run for re-election as Lieutenant Governor.

Secretary of Health and Human Services
After the 2014 election in which Roberts did not stand for election, Governor-elect Gina Raimondo announced Roberts as her nominee for the office of Secretary of the Executive Office of Health and Human Services.

Computer system failure and resignation
In February 2017, Roberts resigned from her post in the Raimondo administration. She left the cabinet-level post for a variety of reasons, but the roll-out of the botched Unified Health Infrastructure Project (a new statewide computer network) overshadowed her tenure. The disastrous UHIP computer network launch in September 2016 saw scores of people without access government to programs such as food stamps and child care due to glitches in the software, designed by Deloitte. This crash created a backlog of over 20,000 cases.

See also
List of female lieutenant governors in the United States

References

External links
Profile from Project Vote Smart
Follow the Money - Elizabeth H. Roberts 2006 campaign contributions

|-

|-

1957 births
Brown University alumni
Boston University School of Management alumni
Lieutenant Governors of Rhode Island
Living people
Politicians from Cranston, Rhode Island
People from Washington, D.C.
Democratic Party Rhode Island state senators
State cabinet secretaries of Rhode Island
Women state legislators in Rhode Island
21st-century American politicians
21st-century American women politicians